Goumenissa is a small traditional town in the Kilkis regional unit, Central Macedonia, Greece. It was the capital of the former Paionia Province. Since the 2011 local government reform it is part of the municipality Paionia, of which it is a community and a municipal unit. The municipal unit has an area of 208.949 km2. The 2011 census recorded 3,609 residents in the community and 6,130 residents in the municipal unit. The town sits on the southeastern part of the Paiko mountain range. Located 69 km northwest of Thessaloniki, 539 km north of Athens and 20 km north of Pella, the ancient capital of the kingdom of Macedon. Goumenissa is the seat of the Greek Orthodox diocese of Goumenissa, Axioupoli and Polykastro.

Goumenissa has narrow streets lined with traditional houses and is renowned for a wide range of things; apart from its preindustrial monuments built beside lush springs, there are traditional wineries which prove the expertise of this small country town to produce good quality wine. It is known for its folklore museum, its impromptu brass bands (Τα Χάλκινα της Γουμένισσας Ta Chalkina tis Goumenissas) and its customs, events and fetes, all of them are reflective of the traditional lifestyle.

Name
There are a lot of versions of the origin of the name Goumenissa. According to the local tradition, robbers hung the Abbot (Greek: Ηγούμενος egoumenos) of the abbey, and the city's name, which means place of Abbot derived from this. In Bulgarian, it was called Гуменидже Gumenidzhe.

History

Hellenistic Era

The town is located in part of the ancient Paeonia, the exact boundaries of which, like the early history of its inhabitants, are very obscure. According to Herodotus (v. 16), they were Teucrian colonists from Troy. Homer (Iliad, book II, line 848) speaks of Paeonians from the Axios River fighting on the side of the Trojans, but the Iliad does not mention whether the Paeonians were kin to the Trojans. Homer gives the Paionian leader as a certain Pyraechmes; later on in the Iliad a second leader is mentioned, Asteropaeus son of Pelagon.

Roman Era (146 BC - 330)

After the Roman conquest of Macedon in 146 BC, Paionia east and west of the Axios formed the second and third districts respectively of the Roman province of Macedonia (Livy xiv. 29). Centuries later under Diocletian, Paionia and Pelagonia formed a province called Macedonia secunda or Macedonia Salutaris, belonging to the Praetorian prefecture of Illyricum.

Byzantine Era (330 - 1387)

When the Roman Empire was divided into eastern and western segments ruled from Constantinople and Rome respectively, Goumenissa came under the control of the Eastern Roman Empire (Byzantine Empire). Goumenissa passed out of Byzantine hands in 1204, when Constantinople was captured by the Fourth Crusade and became part of the Kingdom of Thessalonica - the largest fief of the Latin Empire, covering most of north and central Greece.

In 1224 it was seized by Theodore Komnenos Doukas, the Greek ruler of Despotate of Epirus. The area was recovered by the Byzantine Empire in 1246. First report with the name Goumenissa we have at the year 1346, at the era of Palaiologos Dynasty. In an Imperial Act of this year, the region of Goumenissa is granted in the Holly Abbey Ibyron of Mount Athos and becomes religious centre because of the Monastery of Virgin Mary. Next to Monastery existed a settlement that little later with the union of small agro-pastoral settlements will create a dynamic town that will be named Goumenissa.

Ottoman Era (1387 - 1912)

The Ottomans had captured Goumenissa in 1387. Under the rule of the Ottoman Empire the area was characterized self-governed town and acquired privileges because of the important production of buckram, used for the military uniforms of the Ottoman army. Goumenissa prospered during the 19th century and became economic, cultural and religious centre of the region. The famed wine of Goumenissa, made out of local varieties like Xinomavro and Negoska, become popular in the Ottoman Empire and beyond, particularly in Central Europe.

Even though being a town with privileges, it was not uninvolved in the Greek War of Independence of 1821. By the outbreak of the revolution, the Ottoman army conducted searches of premises and found 49 rifles. This led to violent islamization ordered by Pasha of Thessaloniki Abdul Abud. The punishment included the handing over of money, food, animals and carriages.

The Russian slavist Victor Grigorovich in 1845, however, recorded Igumencho as mostly Bulgarian village. The first Bulgarian school was founded in 1866-1867.

Macedonian Struggle

By 1899, the Bulgarian guerrillas of the Internal Macedonian-Adrianople Revolutionary Organisation (IMRO) turned against Ottoman authorities. Gradually, tensions increased among the followers of the Patriarchate of Constantinople (mostly Greeks) and those of the Bulgarian Exarchate (mostly Bulgarians) to the point of armed conflict.

The rioting in Macedonia, the atrocities of Bulgarian guerrilla troops against Greek locals and especially the death of Pavlos Melas (killed by Turks in 1904) caused intense nationalistic feelings in Greece. This led to the decision to send more Greek guerrilla troops in order to thwart Bulgarian efforts.

The village also had supporters of the Bulgarian cause. Notably, 21 persons joined the Macedonian-Adrianopolitan Volunteer Corps

Conflicts ended after the revolution of Young Turks in July 1908, as they promised to respect all ethnicities and religions and generally to provide a constitution.

On October 23, 1912, during the course of the First Balkan War Goumenissa was conquered by the Greek army and incorporated into the Greek Kingdom.

Greek Macedonian fighters 
Goumenissa: Dimitrios Aliris, Ioannis Aliris, Christos Aliris, Ioannis Vouzas, Vassilios Karakolis, Athanassios Maltsis, Georgios Metaxas, Georgios Pazaretzos, Ioannis Papageorgiou, Nikolaos Papamanolis, Ioannis Pissoutas, Athanassios Pipsos, Georgios Poulkas, Aggelos Sakellariou, Eleni Samara, Georgios Samaras, Dimitrios Samaras, Konstantinos Samaras, Athanassios Slapakis, Dimitrios Slioupikidis, Athanassios Tzanas, Georgios Totsis, Christos Toumpas, Athanassios Tsimirikos, Nikolaos Chatzivrettas, Christos Chatzidimitrakis
Kastaneri: Georgios Dogiamas, Lazaros Dogiamas, Traianos Dogiamas, Christos Dogiamas, Traianos Touloupis,
Karpi: Athanassios Zaras, Athanassios Betsis, Traianos Partoulas, Georgios Softsis, Traianos Softsis,
Griva: Ioannis Ekonomou, Christos Poulkas, Christos Pipsos

Bulgarian Macedonian fighters
Goumenissa: Ichko Boychev (1882–1960), Ivan Limonchev, Ivan Alev (1851–1919), Konstantin Dzekov, Mihail Chakov, Hristo Batandzhiev, Hristo Shaldev, Vangel Gologanov, Gono Azarov, Domitar Shotev, Ivan Karadzov (1870–1913).

Modern Era (1912 - present)

During World War I, late 1915, Franco-British divisions under the command of French General Maurice Sarrail marched on Paionia Province. A French Division camped in Goumenissa and built a military hospital, a power station and the famous Fountain in Central Square.

The population exchanges among Greece, Turkey, and Bulgaria after 1923 resulted in the replacement by Greek refugees from East Thrace, Asia Minor and Eastern Rumelia of most of the Slavic and Turkish elements. Greek Macedonia experienced radical demographic transformations with the arrival of the Pontic Greeks; by 1928, 427 families comprising 1,676 inhabitants arrived from Turkey. The Slavic-speaking minority in Greek Macedonia, who were referred to by the Greek authorities as “Slavomacedonians”, “Slavophone Greeks” and “Bulgarisants”, were subjected to a gradual assimilation by the Greek majority. Their numbers were reduced by a large-scale emigration to North America in the 1920s and the 1930s and to Eastern Europe and Yugoslavia following the Greek Civil War (1944–1949). During World War II Goumenissa and Central Macedonia were occupied (1941–44) by Germany. During the same time a detachment of the pro-Bulgarian paramilitary organization Ohrana was formed.

In the 1950s there was a massive emigration to the United States, Australia, Canada, West Germany and other Greek cities, mainly to Thessaloniki and Athens. In the 1980s many civil war refugees were allowed to re-emigrate.

Subdivisions
The municipal unit Goumenissa is subdivided into the following communities:
Goumenissa (η Γουμένισσα) Town Hall
Griva (η Γρίβα)
Gerakon (η Γερακών)
Karpi (η Κάρπη)
Kastaneri (η Καστανερή)
Omalos (ο Ομαλός)
Pentalofon (το Πεντάλοφον)
Stathis (ο Στάθης)
Filyria (η Φιλυριά)

Mayors of Goumenissa

Landmarks

Central Square
The French Fountain
Square of St. George
Small Square
Macedonian Folklore Museum (Goumenissa)
Silk Factory
Boutari Winery, Aidarinis Winery, Domaine Tatsis, Distillery Dimitri Kambouri
Two Rivers
Traditional mountainous settlement of Kastaneri

Monasteries
Monastery of the Virgin Mary at Goumenissa (Est. 1100)
Belongs to: Diocese of Goumenissa
 
Monastery of St. Nikodimos at Pentalofon (Est. 1981)
Dependency of: the Monastery of Simonos Petra, Mount Athos

Monastery of St. Raphael, Nicholas & Irene at Griva (Est. 1992)
Belongs to: Diocese of Goumenissa

Monastery of St. George at Anydron (Est. 1991) (convent)
Belongs to: Diocese of Goumenissa

Demographics
According to the Hellenic Statistical Authority, in 2001 Goumenissa was the town with the third largest population in Kilkis Prefecture, with an estimated population of 4,073.
  

In Goumenissa live a population of 300 of Rom origin. They live in the south-eastern department of city, which in 1983, with an Act of Municipal Council, was named “Settlement of Saint George”.

Economy
Goumenissa is a famous wine producing region with Appellation d’origine de Qualite Superieure, centre of a region that has been renowned for the quality of its wines for hundreds of years.

Culture
Goumenissa as filming location:
1986: The Beekeeper (Greek: Ο Μελισσοκόμος)
Director:Theo Angelopoulos
Cast: Marcello Mastroianni, Nadia Mourouzi, Jenny Roussea, Dinos Iliopoulos
1981: The Factory (Greek: Το Εργοστάσιο)(French L'usine)
Director:Tasos Psaras
Cast: Vasilis Kolovos, Dimitra Hatoupi

Sport clubs

Climate

Transportation
Goumenissa is accessed  
 From Athens with  GR-1/E75 to Polykastron Interchange
 From Thessaloniki with E86 to Gefyra Junction then E75 to Polykastron Interchange  or E86 to Intetchange after 1 km from  Nea Pella
 From Igoumenitsa and Alexandroupolis with GR-4/GR-2/E90 (Via Egnatia motorway) to Chalastra Interchange then E75 to Polykastron Interchange
 From the Republic of North Macedonia with E75 to Polykastron Interchange
 By bus from Athens and Thessaloniki Bus to Kilkis
 By railway from Thessaloniki and Central Europe to Polykastron Station 15 km from Goumenissa Greek Railways
 By air from Makedonia Airport (SKG) Thessaloniki. If you have a private plane Polykastron Airport 15 km from Goumenissa

References

External links
 goumenissa.info 
 Goumenissa 
 Municipality of Goumenissa - Sightseeing

Wine regions of Greece
Populated places in Kilkis (regional unit)